Ah Girls Go Army is a 2022 Singaporean military comedy film. Directed by Jack Neo, the film follows the first batch of female recruits as they undergo and serve National Service in the fictional near future of Singapore. 

It is a spin-off of Jack Neo’s popular Ah Boys to Men film series. It was released on 1 February 2022 in Singapore, Malaysia and Brunei during the Chinese New Year period.

The film stars Apple Chan, Xixi Lim, Samantha Tan, Shirli Ling, Farah Farook, Eswari Gunasagar, Kelly Kimberly Cheong, Belle Chua Bei Er, Karyn Wong Shimin, Charlene Huang Xiang Lin, Veracia Yong, Juliet Hor, Glenn Yong, Yang Guang Ke Le, Yong Yu, Chloe Goh, Vanessa Tiara Tay, Debra Loi and Summer Loh, along with some cameos from the existing Ah Boys to Men film series.

It was one of the five 2022 Malaysian and Singaporean Chinese New Year films, including Reunion Dinner (Singapore), Nasi Lemak 1.0, Kongsi Raya and Small Town Heroes (Malaysia). On release, the film was panned by critics.

Synopsis
The film is set in a theoretical future where, due to the declining birth rate in Singapore, there are not enough males to fulfil the National Service manpower requirements. The film focuses on the first batch of female SAF recruits, who are 14 Gen-Z girls from different socio-economic backgrounds. They undergo Basic Military Training, which pushes them to their physical and emotional limits. As they undergo their training, they begin to appreciate National Service, and also learn to manage their personal issues.

Cast
 Apple Chan as 2LT Roxanne Tan
 Glenn Yong as 2SG C K Chow
 Yang Guang Ke Le as Recruit Princess See
 Belle Chua as Recruit Joey Tay
 Xixi Lim as Recruit Yuan Yuan Yuan
 Samantha Tan as Recruit Goh Bee Bee
 Eswari Gunasagar as Recruit Kamala
 Charlene Huang as Recruit Lau Lan Lan
 Shirli Ling as Recruit Chow Ai Lian
 Veracia Yong as Recruit Peh Mani
 Kelly Kimberly Cheong as Recruit Amanda Ong
 Karyn Wong as Recruit Karen Seow
 Farah Farook as Recruit Fatimah
 Chloe Goh as Recruit Zhang Li
 Vanessa Tiara Tay as Recruit Bobo Chia
 YY Yong Yu as Recruit Soh Bi Qing
 Juliet Hor as Recruit Monica Chng
 Yong Jackhao as Sergeant Bu Hao
 Debra Loi
 Summer Loh
 Jaze Phua as Sergeant Ho
 Andruew Tang as Sergeant Hulk Tan
 Charlie Goh as LTA C Y Song
 Maxi Lim as CPT Aloysius Jin/"You Die"

Production

Development
Plans for the film were announced in September 2021. Neo had wanted to shoot this film as he wanted to explore the scenario where conscription of women for National Service is required to support Singapore's defence. Neo said that Singaporeans are fortunate to live in a relatively safe and stable world, but wanted to know what happens should the population of young people drop to levels below what is required for defence given the falling birth rate each year. He added that the film wishes to explore if women can step up for defence much like men are expected, mirroring the first batch of male recruits called up in 1967. mm2 Asia Chief Content Creator Ng Say Yong added that the film will be based on the iconic franchise Ah Boys to Men with topics like diversity and gender equality covered in it. The film is sponsored by companies like Holistic Way, Foodpanda, CARRO Group, Nippon Paint, Ogawa, Seng Choon, New York Skin Solutions and Livingcare.

Casting
Casting began via online auditions in September 2021, the same time when plans were first announced. Those who participated were to send videos of themselves acting as a character they chose. The auditions attracted thousands of audition videos submitted for the film, thus increasing the number of female recruit roles from an initial 10 to 14. The cast was unveiled in October that year, with some prominent faces including Apple Chan, ex-Night Owl Cinematics talent Samantha Tan, founder/content creator of Double Up 欢迎光玲 (known for their viral Chinese comedy skits) Charlene Huang Xiang Lin, voice actress and martial arts content creator Kelly Kimberly Cheong, Miss Vasantham finalist Eswari Gunasagar, Farah Farook, Xixi Lim, Mediacorp artistes Yang Guang Ke Le and Glenn Yong among others.

Filming
Filming is expected to last 25 days, with all scenes being completed by November 2021. Shooting only began on 12 November 2021, when the lensing ceremony was held. The scenes were finished in December 2021.

Controversy
An uproar ensued over one of the characters named "Amanda Man" by netizens raising concerns over offence potentially caused to the transgender community and perpetuating misconceptions, coming after actress Kelly Kimberly Cheong posted a picture of herself during the film's lensing ceremony. The post has since been taken down, and Cheong clarified that the character she plays is a "cisgender, biological girl" who is known for her fighting ability. Cheong later raised the issue to Neo, adding that the character is a tomboy and did not mean for the backlash to happen. Nonetheless, Neo still pledged to change the character's name, apologising for any distress caused. The character was eventually changed to "Amanda Ong".

Some criticism was also given to the naming of an obese character as 'Yuan Yuan Yuan' (meaning Round Round Round in Mandarin), which was slammed as fat-shaming and a lack of creativity. Neo refuted these criticisms, saying that people should watch the movie first before commenting and that the character did more things than they thought. Xixi added that the character's name was "cute" as it sounded like her double name, and hopes those watching will get the message that people who are large can do many things just like those who are small.

Release
The film was released in Singapore cinemas on 1 February 2022, the first day of Chinese New Year. Before the release, on 21 January, the producers of the film announced an exclusive giveaway of 8,888 non-fungible tokens via Cathay Cineplexes during advance ticket sales that began on 28 January.

Reception 
The movie received widespread criticism and scorn prior and after its release. The Straits Times film correspondent John Lui gave the film 2/5 stars, remarking that it was "as funny as a positive Covid test", that it "takes effort to be this terrible" - "where effort is made to make fun of women being women", that it was "making fun of people already made fun of in society". Douglas Tseng from 8 Days gave it 1/5 stars, describing Jack Neo's directing and storytelling as "tone deaf", and full of pervasive product placements. Tseng also criticised the unflattering depiction of women in the movie, remaking "Seriously, do young women really behave like this? Jack, when was the last time you hung out with young women?". Lim Yian Lu from Yahoo! Life similarly criticised the product placement and incoherent plot, giving it 1/5 stars. Fasiha Nazren from Mothership pointed out that while the characters were easy to remember and reflect their traits, there were some hit-and-misses for the humour, where some of it is expected from a family-friendly movie with other jokes recycled from other past movies. Fasiha also pointed out the generous product placements with a hint of a future movie and that the theme song sounded like a nursery rhyme. Matthaeus Choo from Sinema.SG commented that though Jack Neo has previous movie successes by bringing to life emotions shared by Singaporeans, the film appeared to be disconnected from reality. Choo added that while Ah Boys to Men was able to scrape by as the characters are stand-ins for people being encountered in real life, the movie does not have that link, criticising the stereotypes that underpin the show. Amanda Tan from Youthopia said that the movie was a "slipshod" rendition of the original Ah Boys to Men film series, referencing previous criticisms made by previous reviewers including a poorly written story and characters not being fully developed with the only saving point being good-looking actors. Tan pointed that as a Gen-Z woman, she only took the message that it was a "misogynistic portrayal of women", being unable to comprehend the unrealistic plot. Delfina Utomo from Time Out said the movie is mostly a "chaotic Facebook Live video of someone selling me products", a film with low-brow humour that is characteristic of Neo's previous films, and the plot revolving around "taking initiative". Utomo also pointed out that the scriptwriters writing the film had no idea of "what it's like being woman", saying that the dialogue and plot appeared condescending even as it avoided objectifying women. This is emphasised by the fact that the film's characters acted or spoke in a childish manner, further elaborated with a film's character whose suicide attempt was treated rather insensitively.

In response to these criticisms, Ah Boys to Men actor Tosh Zhang slammed those hating the film on Facebook, alluding to the silent majority who watched the movie and defending the cast, congratulating them for their effort. Several main and supporting cast members thanked Zhang for his support. Zhang also put up a more forceful post on Instagram. The Ministry of Defence also chimed in, asking anyone that wishes to really know what girls undergo in Basic Military Training to watch their 2015 series instead. Director Jack Neo justified product placements in the film by saying it is difficult to make money from movies. Quoting an example, Neo said that if a movie production cost $1 million, another $3 million is needed before it starts to earn profits.

Box office 
Despite negative reviews, the movie raked in S$1.15 million as of 3 February 2022, with the S$1 million mark achieved over the first six days. It reached the S$1.3 million mark a day later, then S$1.67 million on 7 February and eventually grossing over S$2 million as of 17 February 2022. In Malaysia and Brunei, the film had a grossing of RM1.5 million as of 17 February 2022. Despite high profits at the box office, mm2 Entertainment admitted that reception to the movie was "mixed". Plans for a sequel called "Ah Girls Go Army Part 2" were announced on 7 February 2022, with the release date tentatively set for June 2022. Some scenes have already been shot as part of the sequel, with additional scenes to be shot in March. The film, now known as Ah Girls Go Army Again, was released on 16 June 2022; this received mixed reviews.

References

External links

 Find cinema location and schedules: Malaysia and Singapore

2022 films
Films directed by Jack Neo
Films shot in Singapore
Films set in Singapore
Films set in 2022
Films about armies
Singaporean comedy films
English-language Singaporean films
2022 comedy films